Iranshahr County is in Sistan and Baluchestan province, Iran. The capital of the county is the city of Iranshahr. At the 2006 census, the county's population was 264,226 in 49,443 households. The following census in 2011 counted 219,796 people in 50,978 households, by which time Dalgan District had been separated from the county to become Dalgan County. At the 2016 census, the county's population was 254,314, in 62,625 households. Bampur District was separated from the county in 2018 to form Bampur County.

Administrative divisions

The population history and structural changes of Iranshahr County's administrative divisions over three consecutive censuses are shown in the following table. The latest census shows three districts, seven rural districts, and four cities.

References

 

Counties of Sistan and Baluchestan Province